Courtney Louise McGregor (born 17 November 1998) is a retired artistic gymnast who represented New Zealand. She competed at the 2016 Summer Olympics and retired in 2020.

Early life and education
McGregor was born in 1998 in Christchurch, where she lived until May 2016. Her parents are Tina and Russell McGregor. Of Māori descent, she is affiliated with the Ngāti Kahungunu iwi. She attended Villa Maria College and later switched to The Correspondence School.

Gymnastics career
McGregor started gymnastics at age six. Her first international competitions were the 2012 Pacific Rim Gymnastics Championships in Everett, Washington, and the 2013 Australian Youth Olympic Festival in Sydney. She competed at the 2014 World Artistic Gymnastics Championships in Nanning, China, and also won a bronze medal in the vault at the 2016 Pacific Rim Gymnastics Championships. 

She qualified for the Olympics at the 2016 Gymnastics Olympic Test Event (known as Aquece Rio 2016) in Rio de Janeiro. She was the first artistic gymnast to compete for New Zealand since Laura Robertson at the 2000 Summer Olympics in Sydney. At 17, McGregor was New Zealand's youngest Olympic competitor in 2016. She finished 41st in the all-around in qualifications, with a best placing of 13th on vault.

College career
MacGregor accepted an athletic scholarship at Boise State University and enrolled there in May 2016 to study mathematics and philosophy. Her Christchurch-born coach, Mary Wright, continued to train her in Boise.

She won the 2019 all-around competition for the Mountain West Conference. She was forced to sit out the 2020 season after rupturing her Achilles tendon  and subsequently announced her retirement from gymnastics.

References

1998 births
Living people
New Zealand female artistic gymnasts
Place of birth missing (living people)
Gymnasts at the 2014 Commonwealth Games
Sportspeople from Christchurch
People educated at Villa Maria College, Christchurch
People educated at Te Aho o Te Kura Pounamu
Boise State University people
Gymnasts at the 2016 Summer Olympics
Olympic gymnasts of New Zealand
Ngāti Kahungunu people
New Zealand Māori sportspeople
Commonwealth Games competitors for New Zealand
21st-century New Zealand women